On 5 May 2017, an armed skirmish occurred after Afghan forces attacked a Pakistani census team in Chaman, in Pakistan near the border with Afghanistan. At least 15 people died on both sides in the immediate border clash. It is one of a series of similar border-related incidents between the two countries.

Background
In February 2017, Pakistan closed the border crossings at Torkham and Chaman due to security reasons following the Sehwan suicide bombing. Hours after the blast, the Pakistan Army reportedly launched "strikes" on militant bases in Nangarhar, Afghanistan. In March, 32 days after it was closed, Pakistani Prime Minister Nawaz Sharif ordered the reopening of the Afghanistan–Pakistan border as a "goodwill gesture". Subsequently, the Pakistani government decided to fence selected parts of the country's border with Afghanistan. On 5 April, an Afghan Foreign Ministry spokesman said Kabul might resort to military action if diplomacy failed to resolve the border fencing issue.

The Afghanistan–Pakistan border, known as the Durand Line, runs through the Pashtun ethnic homeland, dividing the region between the two countries. Historically, the Afghan government has disputed the border and resisted attempts at border control or fencing, straining ties between both nations. The Afghan foreign ministry claimed it had also "warned" Pakistan not to conduct its census in the villages near the border area.

Incident
On 5 May, a Pakistani census team who were collecting population data were attacked by Afghan forces. Pakistani officials said that the fighting began after Afghan security forces fired on the census workers and the F.C troops escorting them. The team was present in the Killi Luqman and Killi Jahangir villages, located near the border on the Pakistani side. According to Pakistan, the Afghan Border Police had been notified of the ongoing census activities in advance, but the Afghan forces began creating hurdles for them since 30 April.

Samim Khaplwak, an Afghan spokesman for the governor of Kandahar, claimed that the Pakistani census team had strayed into Afghanistan. An Afghan foreign ministry spokesman claimed the villages were located in Spin Boldak District on their side of the Durand Line disputed by Afghanistan, identifying them as Loqman and Haji Nazar. He said the Afghan forces fired upon the Pakistani personnel.

In return, Pakistani forces attacked the Afghan forces. On Pakistan's side, nine people, including three women and five children lost their lives while 40 others were wounded. On Afghanistan side 50+ border guards were killed while 100+ Afghan security forces, were injured and atleast 1 was captured. It also said that two Pakistani soldiers were also killed and another nine were wounded. Furthermore, the military said Afghanistan asked for a ceasefire which Pakistan accepted. An Afghan government spokesman said they "totally rejected" the casualty figures by Pakistan as "very false". Afghanistan's envoy to Pakistan Omar Zakhilwal said that only two Afghan soldiers were killed and seven injured. He asserted: "The Chaman clash left casualties, deaths and injured on Pakistan side too but we, instead of celebrating, called it unfortunate and regrettable."

Reaction
A spokesman for Kandahar police told Reuters that the Pakistani team were using the census as cover for "malicious activities and to provoke villagers against the government".

The Inspector-General of Pakistan's Frontier Corps, Major-General Nadeem Ahmed, said that Afghan forces had intruded into Pakistani territory and taken positions by occupying houses there. He said the Afghans had targeted civilian populations and used villagers as human shields, but they retreated from their positions after Pakistani forces launched an assault. He also added that Pakistan's international border was "non-negotiable and no compromise will be made on it", and that the Afghan aggression was a result of their government's collusion with India.

The commander of Pakistan Army's Southern Command, Lieutenant-General Aamer Riaz, called the Afghan offensive "foolish" and said Pakistan would respond to such attacks with "full might". In an interview with Radio Pakistan, he commented: "Such attacks won’t benefit Afghanistan in any way and its government should be ashamed of these imprudent actions." He said the Chaman border would remain closed until "Afghanistan changes its behaviour."

Pakistan's Defence Minister Khawaja Muhammad Asif stated if Pakistan's borders were "violated and further destruction occurs, then those responsible will have to pay the price. We will avenge those who cause us destruction." He said Afghanistan had realised it was "at fault", and that Pakistan expected to resolve the matter but it did not receive a "positive response". He also called on the Afghan government to end terrorism.

Aftermath
The Wesh–Chaman border crossing was closed as a result of the skirmish. The border closure resulted in the suspension of the repatriation of Afghan refugees. On 8 May, the census activities halted in urban areas of Chaman resumed. On 12 May, the border crossing was partially reopened for the women, children and sick people. The area is inhabited by Achakzai tribespeople on both sides of the border. Following the skirmish, civilians on both sides were evacuated to safer locations. In Quetta, a group of protesters staged a demonstration outside the Afghan consulate condemning the Afghan forces.

Following a series of flag meetings, both sides started negotiations. It was agreed that a joint geological (sic) or geodetic survey would be carried out to demarcate the border area, and that Google Maps would be considered for this purpose. According to Dawn, the Pakistani side "made it clear" to the Afghans that the two villages affected by the incident belonged to Pakistan's side of the border. On 11 May, the completed survey reports were sent to the governments of both countries. On 27 May, Pakistan said it opened the border on "humanitarian grounds" after a request from Afghan authorities, following the start of Ramadan. This marked the end of a closure lasting 22 days.

See also
 Wesh–Chaman border crossing
 Afghanistan-Pakistan relations

References 

2017 Pakistan border skirmish
2017 in international relations
2017 Afghanistan border skirmish
2010s in Balochistan, Pakistan
Conflicts in 2017
2017 border skirmish
Afghanistan–Pakistan border
May 2017 events in Pakistan
May 2017 events in Afghanistan
2017 Pakistan border skirmish
Military history of Pakistan